The 2011 Seattle Cash Spiel was held from November 25 to 27 at the Granite Curling Club in Seattle, Washington as part of the 2011–12 World Curling Tour. The purse for the event was USD$10,600. The event was held in a triple knockout format. Though the Cash Spiel is a men's event, one women's team, skipped by Cristin Clark, participated.

Teams

Results

A Event

B Event

C Event

Playoffs

External links

Seattle Cash Spiel
Seattle Cash Spiel
Curling in Washington (state)